Uncharacterized protein C1orf21, also known as Proliferation-Inducing Protein 13, is a protein that in humans is encoded by the C1orf21 gene. C1orf21 is an intracellular protein that flows between the nucleus and the cytoplasm in the cell. It has been linked with cell growth and reproduction and there has been strong links with various types of cancers. There are no paralogs for this gene, however, many conserved orthologs have been found in all invertebrates. C1orf21 has low to moderate level of expression in most tissues in humans, however, it has the most expression in the skin, lung and prostate.

Gene

Locus 
C1orf198 is a protein-encoding gene found on the reverse strand of chromosome 1 at the locus 1q25.3.

Gene neighborhood 
C1orf21 is located on the long arm of chromosome 1. It is found at position 5q23.1.

Cytogenic band: 1q25.3

Size 
Chromosome one is one of the longest chromosomes, in which C1orf21 spans from 184,385,826 to 184,390,390 bases, resulting with mRNA transcript that is 10,278 nucleotides long with 4 exons. The protein is 121 amino acids long, containing a domain of unknown function known as DUF4612.

Expression 
NCBI gene and RNA-Seq revealed that C1orf21 is expressed in all tissues at a low to moderate level, however, it is mostly expressed in the skin, brain and prostate.

Gene level regulation

Promoter 

Transcription factor binding sites 
Many transcription factor (TF) binding sites have been predicted through Genomatix. Some important binding cites include MYRE, MARs, and Bright.

MYRE is a myelin regulatory factor. Myelin is produced in the central nervous system and plays a large role in axons. MARs is a special AT-rich sequence-binding protein 1, predominantly expressed in thymocytes, binds to matrix attachment regions. Bright helps with B cell regulator of IgH transcription.

Protein

Subcellular location 
It was predicted that the location of C1orf21 is in the nucleus with 62.2% certainty. The mitochondria was predicted at 17.4%: mitochondrial, while the cytoskeleton, and vascular system at 4.3%.

Structure 
C1orf21 protein is 121 amino acids long with a molecular weight of 18,7 kDa with an isoelectric point of 5.08. It is believed that the protein interacts with the nuclear membrane and contains an unknown domain known as DUF4612. For the secondary and tertiary structure it is predicted that there are many alpha helices in the structure, with the rest of the protein having a disordered structure.

Protein level regulation 
 O-glycosylation sites: Serine 5, Threonine 11, Serine 66, Serine 68, and Serine 69.
 Palmitioyaltion site: Cysteine 3
 Phosphorylation: Serine 34, Serine 44, Serine 66, Serine 69, Serine 75, Serine 95, Serine 115, Serine 121 
 Sumoylation site: Lysine 46 and Lysine 106 
 Tyrosine sulfation site: Tyrosine 113

Interacting proteins

Homology

Paralogs 

There are no isoforms or paralogs of C1orf21 that are known.

Orthologs 
C1orf21 is found in most classes of vertebrates and some invertebrates. The most distant ortholog of C1orf21 is Acropora digitifera, which diverged an estimated 824 million years ago. There is no traces of the C1orf21 gene in organisms that are traced beyond invertebrates, such as fungi, plants, protists, or single celled organisms.

Homologous domains 
The domain of unknown function 4612 (DUF4612) was highly conserved in most orthologs.

Function 
C1orf21 is most likely involved in the growth of cells, especially in the nucleus where replication of DNA occurs.

Clinical significance 
Even though there is not a lot known about C1orf21, there have been some links with diseases. In many studies it has been found that there are links with cancer. Since C1orf21 is associated with cell proliferation, in another study by Sooda et al. there was an interest in the transcript map of the HPC1 locus, to help them identify the susceptibility genes involved in prostate cancer and jaw tumor.  It was seen that overall there are several studies where C1orf21 has been studied on role it plays in cancer for different body areas among many other genes. It was also found that there is a large correlation with affects on keratinocytes since C1orf21 plays a role in ZNF750 silencing.

References

External links

Further reading

Human proteins
Genes on human chromosome 5